The cantons of Belfort are administrative divisions of the Territoire de Belfort department, in northeastern France. Since the French canton reorganisation which came into effect in March 2015, the town of Belfort is subdivided into 3 cantons. Their seat is in Belfort.

Population

References

Cantons of the Territoire de Belfort